The Ezzonids were a dynasty of Lotharingian stock dating back as far as the ninth century. They attained prominence only in the eleventh century, through marriage with the Ottonian dynasty of Holy Roman Emperors. Named after Ezzo, Count Palatine of Lotharingia from 1015 to 1034, they dominated the politics of the middle and lower Rhine and usually represented the royal interests. Under the Salian Emperors, they even briefly held the dukedoms of Swabia, Carinthia, and Bavaria.

He may have had Carolingian ancestors, although some historians prefer to link him to the former Thuringian kings. The political ascent of the Ezzonid dynasty becomes historically visible with the number of counties they acquired in the second half of the tenth century. They ruled most of the Rhenish counties and were eventually granted Palatine status over the other counts of the district. In spite of their military accomplishments in the service of the Emperors, the Ezzonids did not succeed in building a territorial entity in Lotharingia.

The cadet branch of the Ezzonids was the House of Berg who ruled as Counts of Berg. Adolf I, Count of the Mark belonged to a collateral line of the counts of Berg and was founder of the new noble House of La Marck branch of the Counts de la Mark.

Another cadet branch of the Ezzonids is the House of Limburg-Stirum. The family adopted its name in the 12th century from the immediate county of Limburg an der Lenne in what is now Germany, and is one of the oldest families in Europe.  It is the eldest and only surviving branch of the House of Berg, which was among the most powerful dynasties in the region of the lower Rhine during the Middle Ages.

Counts Palatine of Lotharingia 

 Hermann I, Count Palatine of Lotharingia.
 Ezzo, Count Palatine of Lotharingia (1015–1034).  According to the Brauweiler chronicle, he failed to succeed to the monarchy after the death of emperor Otto III (983–1002) in a rivalry with duke Henry II of Bavaria (1002–1024).  The succession war between Ezzo and Henry II continued for over ten years. The two men came to an agreement after a battle at Odernheim in 1011.  Kaiserswerth, Duisburg and the surrounding imperial territories were granted as a fief to Ezzo for renouncing the throne (after 1016).  When the German crown passed from the Ottonians to the Salians in 1024, the Ezzonids remained neutral, apparently after an agreement between Ezzo and Konrad II (1024–1039).
 Otto I, Count Palatine of Lotharingia (1035–1045) and Duke of Swabia (1045–1047). In 1045, after a successful campaign against the rebel count of Flanders, the margrave of Valenciennes and Ename, Otto received the duchy of Swabia, in exchange however for the cities of Kaiserswerth and Duisburg, which went back to the crown. At the same time, the palatinate of Lotharingia was passed to his nephew.
Heinrich I, Count Palatine of Lotharingia (1045–1060, †1061), son of Count Hezzelin I (1020–1033), who was a brother of Ezzo.
Hermann II, Count Palatine of Lotharingia (1064–1085), Count of the Ruhrgau, Zulpichgau and Brabant. His territorial power was importantly reduced by his guardian, Anno II, Archbishop of Cologne.  Hermann is assumed to be the last of the Ezzonids. After his death at Dalhem on September 20, 1085, the Palatinate of Lotharingia was suspended. His widow remarried the first count palatine of the Rhine, Henry of Laach.

The Ezzonid line probably survived in the counts of Limburg Stirum, who are believed to descend from Adolf I of Lotharingia, youngest son of Hermann I.

Other illustrious Ezzonids 

 Richeza of Lotharingia, Queen of Poland (Bl. Richenza, whose Feast is celebrated in Roman Catholic Church on March 21), wife of Mieszko II Lambert King of Poland.
 Conrad I, Duke of Bavaria, heir of Henry III, Holy Roman Emperor, died in exile after an attempt to assassinate the Emperor and seize the throne.
 Conrad III, Duke of Carinthia.
 Hermann I, Archbishop of Cologne, Chancellor of King Zwentibold of Lotharingia.
 Hermann II, Archbishop of Cologne and Chancellor for Italy.

Further reading 
 Reuter, Timothy, 'Germany in the Early Middle Ages 800–1056', New York: Longman, 1991.
 Buhlmann, Michael, 'Quellen zur mittelalterlichen Geschichte Ratingens und seiner Stadtteile: I. Eine Werdener Urbaraufzeichnung (9. Jahrhundert, 1. Hälfte). II. Eine Königsurkunde Ludwigs des Kindes (3. August 904)', Die Quecke 69 (1999), pp. 90–94.
 Droege, G., 'Pfalzgrafschaft, Grafschaften und allodiale Herrschaften zwischen Maas und Rhein in salisch-staufischer Zeit’, Rheinische Vierteljahrsblätter 26 (1961), pp. 1–21.
 Gerstner, Ruth, 'Die Geschichte der lothringischen Pfalzgrafschaft (von den Anfängen bis zur Ausbildung des Kurterritoriums Pfalz)', Rheinisches Archiv 40 (Bonn, 1941)
 Kimpen, E., ‘Ezzonen und Hezeliniden in der rheinischen Pfalzgrafschaft’, Mitteilungen des Österreichischen Instituts für Geschichtsforschung. XII. Erg.-Band. (Innsbruck, 1933) pp. 1–91.
 Lewald, Ursula, 'Die Ezzonen. Das Schicksal eines rheinischen Fürstengeschlechts', in Rheinische Vierteljahrsblätter 43 (1979) pp. 120–168
 Lorenz, Sönke, 'Kaiserwerth im Mittelalter. Genese, Struktur und Organisation königlicher Herrschaft am Niederrhein', in Studia humaniora 23 (Düsseldorf, 1993)
 Renn, H., 'Die Luxemburger in der lothringischen Pfalzgrafschaft’, in Rheinische Vierteljahrsblätter 11 (1941) pp. 102–118
 Steinbach, F., ‘Die Ezzonen. Ein Versuch territorialpolitischen Zusammenschlusses der fränkischen Rheinlande’, in Collectanea Franz Steinbach. Aufsätze und Abhandlungen zur Verfassungs-, Sozial- und Wirtschaftsgeschichte, geschichtlichen Landeskunde und Kulturraumforschung, ed. F. Petri & G. Droege (Bonn, 1967) pp. 64–81.
 Tolnerus, C. L., Historia palatina seu prim. et antiquiss. Comitum Palatinarum ad Rhenum res gestae (etc.) (Frankfurt am Main, 1700); and Additiones (Frankfurt am Main, 1709)
 Van Droogenbroeck, F. J., ‘Paltsgraaf Herman II (†1085) en de stichting van de abdij van Affligem (28 juni 1062) ’, in Jaarboek voor Middeleeuwse Geschiedenis 2 (Hilversum, 1999) pp. 38–95.
 Van Droogenbroeck, F.J., ‘De betekenis van paltsgraaf Herman II (1064-1085) voor het graafschap Brabant’, in Eigen Schoon en De Brabander 87 (Brussels, 2004) pp. 1–166.
 Wisplinghoff, E., 'Zur Reihenfolge der lothringischen Pfalzgrafen am Ende des 11. Jahrhunderts’, in Rheinische Vierteljahrsblätter 28 (1963) pp. 290–293.